Martin Pregelj (born 6 May 1977) is a Slovenian football manager and former player who played as a midfielder.

External links
NZS profile 

1977 births
Living people
Sportspeople from Koper
Slovenian footballers
Association football midfielders
Slovenian expatriate footballers
FC Koper players
NK Maribor players
SK Sturm Graz players
Enosis Neon Paralimni FC players
NK IB 1975 Ljubljana players
ND Mura 05 players
NK Železničar Maribor players
Slovenian expatriate sportspeople in Austria
Slovenian expatriate sportspeople in Cyprus
Expatriate footballers in Austria
Expatriate footballers in Cyprus
Slovenian PrvaLiga players
Austrian Football Bundesliga players
Cypriot First Division players
Slovenian Second League players
Slovenian football managers